"Every Man for Himself" is a song recorded by American country music artist Neal McCoy.  It was released in September 2000 as the second single from the album 24-7-365.  The song reached #37 on the Billboard Hot Country Singles & Tracks chart.  The song was written by Tim Johnson and Mark Elliott.

Content
The song is about a group of men who paid too much attention to careers and lost their families.

Chart performance

References

2000 singles
2000 songs
Neal McCoy songs
Songs written by Tim Johnson (songwriter)
Giant Records (Warner) singles